The Tennessee Agricultural Museum is an agricultural museum based at the Ellington Agricultural Center in Brentwood, Tennessee. It organizes the Annual Rural Life Festival.

References

Museums in Nashville, Tennessee
Agriculture museums in the United States